Basera may refer to:
 Basera is a Hindi language word meaning "Abode".

Basera may also refer to:
 Basera (DD1 TV series), a drama-series that aired on DD National channel in early 90s
 Basera (Zee TV series), a serial that aired on the Indian satellite television network Zee TV in 2000
 Basera (2009 TV series), a television series premiered on NDTV Imagine in 2009
 Baseraa, a Hindi film that released in 1981
 Bashera (surname)